Jason M. White (born May 3, 1973) is a Canadian professional stock car racing driver. He competes part-time in the NASCAR Craftsman Truck Series, driving the No. 34 Toyota Tundra for Reaume Brothers Racing and part-time in the ARCA Menards Series, driving the No. 44 Chevrolet SS for Jeff McClure Racing.

Racing career

Early career
In the early portions of White's career, he raced super modified, mini-sprint and street stock cars on the United States and Canadian west coasts.

CASCAR West Series
White raced for three years in the series from 2004 to 2006, with a career-best finish of 6th in 2005.

Pinty's Series

Since 2005, White has been racing in the Pinty’s Series every year, driving the No. 21 Powder Ventures Excavating Dodge owned by his wife, Melissa McKenzie. In the 2019 season, he became the first driver from western Canada to reach 100 starts in the series.

Craftsman Truck Series
White made his Truck Series debut in 2018, driving the No. 33 Chevrolet Silverado for Reaume Brothers Racing. He started 27th and finished 23rd, two laps down. In 2019, White returned to RBR in an attempt to make the Daytona race, but failed to qualify. He made a second attempt at Daytona with RBR in 2020, and collected his first top-ten finish. White would return to RBR for the season-opener at Daytona again in 2021 as well as the following week's race at the Daytona Road Course. In both races, he drove the No. 33 truck. White would race the season-opener at Daytona again in 2022 for RBR with a 20th place finish. White would fail to qualify at Talladega later that season. White would again return to RBR to drive the No. 34 truck at Daytona in 2023, resulting in a 21st place finish.

ARCA Menards Series
In 2019, White made his ARCA debut driving the No. 11 Chevrolet for Fast Track Racing at Daytona, where he finished 16th. He improved to a sixth-place showing at Daytona in 2020, also with FTR. He would drive the No. 44 Chevy in 2022 and 2023. He would finish 9th in 2023 after getting passed on the final lap from the lead.

Personal life
White resides in Sun Peaks, British Columbia, and has three children.

Motorsports career results

NASCAR
(key) (Bold – Pole position awarded by qualifying time. Italics – Pole position earned by points standings or practice time. * – Most laps led.)

Craftsman Truck Series

 Season still in progress
 Ineligible for series points

ARCA Menards Series
(key) (Bold – Pole position awarded by qualifying time. Italics – Pole position earned by points standings or practice time. * – Most laps led.)

References

External links
 
 

Living people
1973 births
NASCAR drivers
Racing drivers from British Columbia
Sportspeople from Abbotsford, British Columbia
ARCA Menards Series drivers